The 2018–19 season will be Crawley Town's 123rd season in their history and their fourth consecutive season in League Two. Along with League Two, the club will also compete in the FA Cup, EFL Cup and EFL Trophy.

The season covers the period from 1 July 2018 to 30 June 2019.

Players

First team squad

New contracts

Transfers

In

Out

Loans in

Loans out

Pre-season
Crawley Town announced friendlies with Fulham, Ipswich Town, Charlton Athletic.

Competitions

League Two

League table

Results summary

Results by matchday

Matches

The fixtures for the 2018–19 season were announced on 21 June 2018 at 9am.

FA Cup

The first round draw was made live on BBC by Dennis Wise and Dion Dublin on 22 October.

EFL Cup

On 15 June 2018, the draw for the first round was made in Vietnam.

EFL Trophy

On 13 July 2018, the initial group stage draw bar the U21 invited clubs was announced.

Statistics

Appearances

Top scorers
The list is sorted by shirt number when total goals are equal.

Clean sheets
The list is sorted by shirt number when total appearances are equal.

Summary

References

2018-19
Crawley Town